The 1950 U.S. Open was the 50th U.S. Open, held June 8–11 at the East Course of Merion Golf Club in Ardmore, Pennsylvania, a suburb northwest of Philadelphia. In what became known as the "Miracle at Merion," 1948 champion Ben Hogan won the second of his four U.S. Open titles in an 18-hole playoff over 1946 champion Lloyd Mangrum and George Fazio, just 16 months after being severely injured in an automobile accident. It was the fourth of Hogan's nine major titles.

Lee Mackey established a new tournament record by shooting a 64 in the first round, but followed that up with an 81 and finished in 25th place. His score of 64 was not bettered in any other major championship for 23 years, until Johnny Miller closed with a 63 at the U.S. Open in 1973 to win at Oakmont. Tommy Armour, three-time major champion and winner in 1927, played in his final major and missed the cut.

This was the second U.S. Open played at Merion's East Course, which previously hosted sixteen years earlier in 1934, won by Olin Dutra. Opened in 1912, the course was the site of the U.S. Amateur in 1916, 1924, and 1930; the first was the debut of Bobby Jones at age 14 (quarterfinalist) and the latter two he won. The 1930 victory was the fourth and final leg of his grand slam.

Hogan made his U.S. Open debut at Merion in 1934 at age 21. He shot 79 (+9) twice and missed the 36-hole cut by three strokes. He made his first cut at the U.S. Open in 1939 and did not miss another; his last was in 1967 at age 54.

Course 

East Course 

Source:

Past champions in the field

Made the cut 

Source:

Missed the cut 

Source:

Round summaries

First round 
Thursday, June 8, 1950

Source:

Scorecard 

Source:

Second round 
Friday, June 9, 1950

Source:

Third round 
Saturday, June 10, 1950   (morning)

Source:

Final round 
Saturday, June 10, 1950   (afternoon)

Mangrum began the final round with a one-shot lead over Dutch Harrison and a two-stroke lead over Hogan, defending champion Cary Middlecoff, and Johnny Palmer. Fazio was the first to post 287 (+7) after an even-par 70. Mangrum struggled early in his round, carding six bogeys on the first seven holes and shot 76 (+6), which also left him at 287. Hogan had a chance to win the tournament in regulation  but missed a short putt for par at 15 and then bogeyed the par-3 17th. He two-putted for par to join Mangrum and Fazio in the Sunday playoff. Middlecoff and Palmer both shot 79 and fell to tenth place.

Source:

Scorecard

Cumulative tournament scores, relative to par
Source:

Playoff 
Sunday, June 11, 1950

The three players were within one stroke of each other as late as the 13th hole, with Hogan at even par and Fazio and Mangrum at one-over. Fazio bogeyed four of the last five holes to fall out of contention, while Hogan led Mangrum by a single stroke through 15. Mangrum's tee shot at 16 went into heavy rough but his third shot stopped  from the hole. As he putted to save par, he picked up his ball to remove a bug that had landed on it, a violation of the rules (then rule 10, paragraph 2). Mangrum rolled it in, but was assessed a two-stroke penalty at the next tee; the double-bogey allowed Hogan to cruise to a four-stroke victory. Hogan had just one bogey, while Fazio had seven and Mangrum four, plus the double-bogey for the rules violation.

Source:
 This was the final three-way playoff at the U.S. Open that determined a third-place finisher; at the next in 1963, non-winners tied for second.

Scorecard 

{|class="wikitable" span = 50 style="font-size:85%;
|-
|style="background: Pink;" width=10|
|Birdie
|style="background: PaleGreen;" width=10|
|Bogey
|style="background: Green;" width=10|
|Double bogey
|}
Source:

References

External links 

USGA Championship Database
USOpen.com – 1950
Trenham Golf History – 1950 U.S. Open

U.S. Open (golf)
Golf in Pennsylvania
U.S. Open
U.S. Open
U.S. Open golf
U.S. Open golf